Ərçivan is a village and the most populous municipality, except the capital Astara, in the Astara Rayon of Azerbaijan.  It has a population of 8,084.

References 

Populated places in Astara District